Roger Anger (24 March 1923 – 15 January 2008) was a French architect who worked on the Auroville project, designed by Mirra Alfassa and endorsed by UNESCO and the Government of India. He also collaborated many times with Pierre Puccinelli, notably on the Île Verte in Grenoble.

References

Bibliography 
 Anupama Kundoo: Roger Anger, Research on Beauty, Architecture 1953-2008, JOVIS Verlag Berlin 2009, 

20th-century French architects
21st-century French architects
1923 births
2008 deaths
Architects from Paris